Shahid Ab Shanasan Garrison ( – Pādegān-e Shahīd Āb Shanāsān) is a village and military installation in Anzal-e Jonubi Rural District, Anzal District, Urmia County, West Azerbaijan Province, Iran. At the 2006 census, its population was 709, in 190 families.

References 

Populated places in Urmia County
Military installations of Iran